Kishkin can refer to
 Kaneshkin a village in Iran
 Nikolai Kishkin, (1864-1930) Russian politician